USS Prowess (AM-280) was an  built for the United States Navy during World War II. At war's end she was placed in reserve. In the mid-1960s, she was converted into a training ship for U.S. Naval Reserve personnel. She was transferred to South Vietnam in June 1970 as RVNS Ha Hoi (HQ-13) in the Republic of Vietnam Navy. In 1975, Ha Hoi was seized by North Vietnamese forces and incorporated into the Vietnamese People's Navy. She remained in service until 1998, when she was converted into a training ship. She has since been scrapped.

Career 
Prowess was laid down 15 September 1943 by Gulf Shipbuilding Corp., Chickasaw, Alabama; launched 17 February 1944; sponsored by Mrs. Thomas W. Rubottom; and commissioned 27 September 1944. Following shakedown out of Little Creek, Virginia, Prowess escorted USS Pontiac (AF-20) from Boston, Massachusetts, to Bermuda, departing Boston 14 December 1944. Upon returning to Little Creek, she trained minesweeper personnel from 1 January 1945 to 31 August. Departing Little Creek 3 October, she participated in festivities honoring Admiral Nimitz at Washington, D.C., in early October. After a visit to Wilmington, Delaware, she returned to Norfolk, Virginia.

Prowess entered the Atlantic Reserve Fleet in December 1945. She was reclassified MSF-280 on 7 February 1955. Assigned a homeport of Buffalo, New York, from 1 September 1965 and reclassified as an Unclassified Miscellaneous Auxiliary IX-305 on 1 March 1966, she has served as a naval reserve training ship from February 1962 into 1970.

She was transferred to South Vietnam, 4 June 1970 as RVNS Ha Hoi (HQ-13) and struck from the Naval Register in 1970. She was captured by North Vietnamese forces in 1975. In 1998, after some 23 years of service in the Vietnamese People's Navy, she was hulked and converted to a training vessel. She has since been scrapped.

References 
 
 

Admirable-class minesweepers
Ships built in Chickasaw, Alabama
1944 ships
World War II minesweepers of the United States
Admirable-class minesweepers of the Republic of Vietnam Navy
Vietnam War naval ships of South Vietnam
Ships of the Vietnam People's Navy